Darreh Garm (also known as Bī Gol) is a village in Karvandar Rural District, in the Central District of Khash County, Sistan and Baluchestan Province, Iran. At the 2006 census, its population was 43, in 10 families.

References 

Populated places in Khash County